Raphael Anthony Lumenti (December 21, 1936 – February 7, 2018) was an American professional baseball player. He appeared in 13 games played, six as a starting pitcher.

Lumenti attended Boston University and the University of Massachusetts Amherst before signing a bonus contract with Washington on September 2, 1957. He made his debut five days later, pitching a scoreless ninth inning in a 4–1 loss to the New York Yankees at Griffith Stadium. The Bonus Rule then in effect forced the Senators to keep Lumenti on their Major League roster for his first two professional seasons; however, after pitching 11 games in 1957–58, Washington was able to send Lumenti to the Chattanooga Lookouts of the Double-A Southern Association. He made two more appearances in Washington in 1959 before finishing his career in minor league baseball after the 1961 season.

Altogether, Lumenti hurled  innings in MLB, allowed 32 hits and 42 bases on balls, while striking out 30.

Lumenti died on February 7, 2018.

References

External links

1936 births
2018 deaths
Baseball players from Massachusetts
Boston University Terriers baseball players
Charleston Senators players
Charlotte Hornets (baseball) players
Chattanooga Lookouts players
Major League Baseball pitchers
People from Milford, Massachusetts
Sportspeople from Worcester County, Massachusetts
Syracuse Chiefs players
UMass Minutemen baseball players
Washington Senators (1901–1960) players